The Saddle River School District is a community public school district that serves students in pre-kindergarten through fifth grade from Saddle River, in Bergen County, New Jersey, United States.

As of the 2018–19 school year, the district, comprising one school, had an enrollment of 165 students and 18.5 classroom teachers (on an FTE basis), for a student–teacher ratio of 8.9:1. In the 2016–17 school year, Saddle River was tied for the 28th-smallest enrollment of any school district in the state, with 150 students.

The district was classified by the New Jersey Department of Education as being in District Factor Group "J", the-highest of eight groupings. District Factor Groups organize districts statewide to allow comparison by common socioeconomic characteristics of the local districts. From lowest socioeconomic status to highest, the categories are A, B, CD, DE, FG, GH, I and J.

Public school students from Saddle River attend the Ramsey Public School District's middle school and then have the option of attending either Ramsey High School or Northern Highlands Regional High School as part of sending/receiving relationships with each of the respective districts. As of the 2018–19 school year, Northern Highlands High School had an enrollment of 1,377 students and 110.4 classroom teachers (on an FTE basis), for a student–teacher ratio of 12.5:1. while Ramsey High School had an enrollment of 870 students and 80.4 classroom teachers (on an FTE basis), for a student–teacher ratio of 10.8:1. One of under ten districts with a dual send-receive relationship, three quarters of Saddle River's high school students attend Northern Highlands and about a quarter attend Ramsey High School.

Schools
Wandell School served 162 students in pre-kindergarten through fifth grade as of the 2018–19 school year.
Glenn Stokes, Vice Principal

Administration
Core members of the district's administration are:
Dr. Gina Cinotti, Superintendent / Principal
Tom Duane, Board Secretary / Business Administrator

Board of education
The district's board of education, with five members, sets policy and oversees the fiscal and educational operation of the district through its administration. As a Type II school district, the board's trustees are elected directly by voters to serve three-year terms of office on a staggered basis, with either one or two seats up for election each year held (since 2012) as part of the November general election.

As of 2012, school elections were shifted from April to the November general election as part of an effort to reduce the costs of a standalone April vote.

References

External links
Saddle River School District

Saddle River School District, National Center for Education Statistics
Ramsey High School
Northern Highlands Regional High School

Saddle River, New Jersey
New Jersey District Factor Group J
School districts in Bergen County, New Jersey